Ștefan Constantin (born 25 June 1959 in Constanța) is a former Romanian rugby union player. He played as lock.

Career
Grown in the RCJ Farul Constanța youth team, along with his older brother Laurențiu he formed a lock combination that was the backbone of the club and of the Romania national team throughout the decade, winning the national title with Farul in 1986.

His international debut was on 1980, during the FIRA Trophy in Constanța, during a 41–11 victory against Morocco and he was also called up for the Romania squad at the 1987 Rugby World Cup, where he played the last of his 18 international matches.

After his stint in Romania, he accepted Gheorghe Dumitru's proposal to play for USA Limoges, where Constantin played in the early 1990s.

Remaining in France, Constantin also was the talent scout for Limoges.

References

External links
Ștefan Constantin International Statistics

1959 births
Living people
Romanian rugby union players
Rugby union locks
Romania international rugby union players
Romanian expatriate rugby union players
Expatriate rugby union players in France
Romanian expatriate sportspeople in France
Sportspeople from Constanța